Theatre Centre is a UK-based theatre company touring new plays for young audiences aged 4 to 18. Founded in 1953 by Brian Way, the company has developed plays by writers including Lisa Evans, Noël Greig, Mike Kenny, Bryony Lavery, Leo Butler, Brendan Murray, Philip Osment, Manjinder Virk, Roy Williams and Benjamin Zephaniah. Theatre Centre is a member of Theatre for Young Audiences UK (TYA-UK), a network for makers and promoters of professional theatre for young audiences.
Brian Way and Margaret Faulkes founded Theatre Centre in 1953. When they produced a shortened version of Dorothy L. Sayers’ The Man Born To Be King, the production inspired Sayers to donate  £200 to help establish the company. The company's "initial aim was to provide a place where unemployed actors might meet and practise their art", Laurence Harbottle (of Harbottle & Lewis) reported in 2006. "What it became was the launch pad for educational theatre in schools – and what Brian became, in the next half century, was the seminal influence on that movement, worldwide."
Many of Theatre Centre's early plays were written by Brian Way himself. Way believed plays should be written for a specific age group., and "argued that the quality of performance deteriorates" when audience numbers increase. Theatre Centre productions were "presented informally on the floor of the school hall, in the round." Today, Theatre Centre shows tour to schools and venues around the country and the company has a focus on writers creating "exciting work for young audiences."
Theatre Centre is a registered charity and is an Arts Council England National Portfolio Organisation.

Awards 

Theatre Centre administrates two prizes for writers, the Brian Way Award for Best New Play (formerly The Children's Award, established by Arts Council England) and the Adrienne Benham Award. The Brian Way Award is presented annually to the writer of a play for young people which has been professionally produced, and the Adrienne Benham Award to a writer who wishes to write a play for young people but who hasn't previously done so.
Winners of the Brian Way Award for Best New Play:
 2012: Evan Placey for Holloway Jones (Synergy Theatre Company)
 2011: Keith Saha for Ghost Boy (20 Stories High)
 2010: Laurence Wilson for Blackberry Trout Face (20 Stories High)
 2009: Douglas Maxwell for The Mothership (Birmingham Repertory Theatre)
 2008: David Greig for Yellow Moon (TAG) 
 2008: Fin Kennedy (runner-up) for Locked In (Half Moon Theatre Company) 
 2007: Tim Crouch for Shopping for Shoes (National Theatre Education Department) 
 2007: Deborah Gearing (runner-up) for Burn (Shell Connections) 
 2006: Neil Duffield for The Lost Warrior (Dukes Theatre, Lancaster) 
 2005: Abi Bown for Hey There Boy with the Bebop (Polka Theatre) 
 2004: Charles Way for Red Red Shoes (Unicorn Theatre) 
 2003: Phil Porter for Smashed Eggs (Pentabus Theatre) 
 2002: Brendan Murray for Eliza's House (Royal Exchange) 
 2001: Mike Kenny for Stepping Stones (Interplay)

Winners of the Adrienne Benham Award:
 2012: Kenneth Emson 
 2011: Marcelo Dos Santos
 2010: Paula B. Stanic
 2009: Steven Bloomer

References

Sources 
Modern British Playwriting: The 1980s: Voices, Documents, New Interpretations, Jane Milling, Methuen Drama, 2012. .
Working With Theatre in Schools, Clive Webster, Pitman Publishing, 1975. .
Advice for the Young at Heart, Roy Williams, Methuen Drama, 2013. .

Further reading 

Theatre Centre: Plays for Young People, Aurora Metro Publications, 2003. .
Child Drama, Peter Slade, Hodder and Stoughton, 1976.
Development Through Drama, Brian Way, Humanities Press, New York, 1967.
Audience Participation – Theatre for Young People, Brian Way, Walter H. Baker Company, 1981.
Working With Theatre in Schools, Clive Webster, Pitman Publishing, 1975. .
The Magic World of Brian Way's Plays, Ronald Wood, Baker's Plays, 1977.

External links 
 Theatre Centre website

1953 establishments in England
Children's theatre
Theatre companies in England